The Sunset Strip is the name given to the mile-and-a-half (2.4 km) stretch of Sunset Boulevard that passes through West Hollywood, California.

Sunset Strip also may refer to:
Sunset Strip, Victoria
 Sunset Strip (1985 film), a B-American action film directed by William Webb
 Sunset Strip (2000 film), an American comedy-drama film directed by Adam Collis
 Sunset Strip (2012 film), a documentary by Hans Fjellestad
 "Sunset Strip" (song), a song by Roger Waters
 "Sunset Strip", a song on the BatBox album by Miss Kittin
 Sunset Strip (composition),  an orchestral composition by Michael Daugherty
Sunset Strippers, a band

See also
77 Sunset Strip, television series